Laguna Niguel/Mission Viejo is a station on the Inland Empire–Orange County Line and Orange County Line of the Metrolink commuter rail system around Southern California. Originally built to serve Metrolink, the station became a stop for Amtrak's Pacific Surfliner in 2007 but is currently not used as a limited Amtrak stop on the Pacific Surfliner route. Total daily ridership for Metrolink and Amtrak was about 500 passengers in fiscal year 2009. Of the 73 California stations served by Amtrak, Laguna Niguel/Mission Viejo was the 71st-busiest in FY2010, boarding or detraining an average of approximately seven passengers daily. Metrolink trains terminate here and if they do by noon time, one train set moves over to a nearby siding track until the rush hour.

Hours and frequency

References

External links

Laguna Niguel/ Mission Viejo Metrolink Station(USA RailGuide -- TrainWeb)
Laguna Niguel/Mission Viejo (LNL)--Great American Stations (Amtrak)

Former Amtrak stations in California
Metrolink stations in Orange County, California
Railway stations in the United States opened in 2002